The Carracks black sword, sometimes called a crab sword, is a type of sword invented in Portugal, during the 15th century, designed to be used by soldiers and sailors in ships and caravels in the Age of Discovery.

It is characterized by having a guard with two protective rings, with the guard terminals in the form of two flat drops pointing toward the tip of the blade, and forming large round plates sharpened sufficiently to be used as extra blades convenient in close combat.

The protective rings, in addition to their function to guard the fingers, can also serve to trap an opponent's blade.

These swords were painted black to prevent reflected light from betraying their presence on ships, as well as to mitigate corrosion caused by salt water.

The sword was also known among Portuguese soldiers as colhona (which in rude Portuguese means approximately “big balls”) due to the round terminal plates resembling a pair of testicles in combination with the general phallic form of the sword.

This type of sword would have appeared between 1460 and 1480 and saw much of its use in Portuguese trading cities in Africa, coming to be used as a symbol of honor by the local chiefs.

See also
Portuguese discoveries
Golden Age of Portugal
Feitoria

Notes

Renaissance-era swords
Maritime history of Portugal
Portuguese inventions
Weapons of Portugal